In the mathematical field of Lie theory, the radical of a Lie algebra  is the largest solvable ideal of 

.
where  is semisimple. When the ground field has characteristic zero and  has finite dimension, Levi's theorem states that this exact sequence splits; i.e., there exists a (necessarily semisimple) subalgebra of  that is isomorphic to the semisimple quotient  via the restriction of the quotient map 

A similar notion is a Borel subalgebra, which is a (not necessarily unique) maximal solvable subalgebra.

Definition 

There exists a unique maximal solvable ideal, called the radical, for the following reason.

It is nonempty since  is a solvable ideal, and it is a solvable ideal by the sum property just derived. Clearly it is the unique maximal solvable ideal.

Related concepts 
 A Lie algebra is reductive if and only if its radical equals its center.

See also 
Levi decomposition

References

Lie algebras